Hermès International S.A., or simply Hermès, is a French luxury design house established in 1837. It specializes in leather goods, lifestyle accessories, home furnishings, perfumery, jewelry, watches and ready-to-wear. Its logo, since the 1950s, is of a Duke carriage with horse.

History

Beginnings in the 19th century

Thierry Hermès was born in Krefeld, Germany, to a French father and a German mother. The family moved to France in 1828. In 1837, Hermès first established a harness workshop in the Grands Boulevards quarter of Paris, dedicated to serving European noblemen. He created high-quality wrought harnesses and bridles for the carriage trade, winning several awards including the first prize in its class in 1855, and again in 1867, at the Expositions Universelles in Paris.

Hermès's son, Charles-Émile, took over management from his father in 1880, and moved the shop to 24 rue du Faubourg Saint-Honoré, where it remains. With the help of his sons Adolphe and Émile-Maurice, Charles-Émile introduced saddlery and started selling his products retail. The company catered to the élite of Europe, North Africa, Russia, Asia, and the Americas. In 1900, the firm offered the Haut à Courroies bag, specially designed for riders to carry their saddles with them.

Hermès Frères era
After Charles-Émile Hermès's retirement, sons Adolphe and Émile-Maurice took leadership and renamed the company Hermès Frères. Shortly after, Émile-Maurice began furnishing the tsar of Russia with saddles. By 1914, up to 80 saddle craftsmen were employed. Subsequently, Émile-Maurice was granted the exclusive rights to use the zipper for leather goods and clothing, becoming the first to introduce the device in France. In 1918, Hermès introduced the first leather golf jacket with a zipper, made for Edward, Prince of Wales. Because of its exclusive rights arrangement the zipper became known in France as the fermeture Hermès (Hermès fastener).

Throughout the 1920s, when he was the sole head of the firm, Émile-Maurice added accessories and clothing collections. He also groomed his three sons-in-law (Robert Dumas, Jean-René Guerrand, and Francis Puech) as business partners. In 1922, the first leather handbags were introduced after Émile-Maurice's wife complained of not being able to find one to her liking. Émile-Maurice created the handbag collection himself.

In 1924, Hermès established a presence in the United States and opened two shops outside of Paris. In 1929, the first women's couture apparel collection was previewed in Paris. During the 1930s, Hermès introduced some of its most recognized original goods such as the leather "Sac à dépêches" in 1935 (later renamed the "Kelly bag" after Grace Kelly), and the Hermès carrés (square scarves) in 1937.

The scarves became integrated into French culture. In 1938, the "Chaîne d'ancre" bracelet and the riding jacket and outfit joined the classic collection. By this point, the company's designers began to draw inspirations from paintings, books, and objets d'art. The 1930s also witnessed Hermès's entry into the United States market by offering products in a Neiman Marcus department store in New York; however, it later withdrew. In 1949, the same year as the launch of the Hermès silk tie, the first perfume, "Eau d'Hermès", was produced.

From the mid-1930s, Hermès employed Swiss watchmaker Universal Genève as the brand's first and exclusive designer of timepieces, producing a line of men's wrist chronographs (manufactured in 18K gold or stainless steel) and women's Art Déco cuff watches in 18K gold, steel, or platinum. Both models contained dials signed either "Hermès" or "Hermès Universal Genève", while the watch movements were signed "Universal Genève S.A.". The Hermès/Universal partnership lasted until the 1950s.

Émile-Maurice summarized the Hermès philosophy during his leadership as "leather, sport, and a tradition of refined elegance."

Post-Émile-Maurice Hermès
Robert Dumas-Hermès (1898–1978), who succeeded Émile-Maurice after his death in 1951, closely collaborated with brother-in-law Jean-René Guerrand. Dumas became the first man not directly descended from Hermès père to lead the company because his connection to the family was only through marriage. Thus, he incorporated the Hermès name into his own, Dumas-Hermès.

The company also acquired its Duc-carriage-with-horse logo and signature orange paper boxes in the early 1950s. Dumas introduced original handbags, jewelry, and accessories and was particularly interested in design possibilities with the silk scarves. During the mid-20th century, scarf production diminished. World Tempus, a Web portal dedicated to watchmaking, states: "Brought to life by the magic wand of Annie Beaumel, the windows of the store on the [rue du] Faubourg Saint-Honoré became a theatre of enchantment and [established the store as] a Parisian meeting-place for international celebrities." In 1956, Life magazine featured a photograph of Grace Kelly, who had become the new Princess of Monaco, carrying the "Sac à dépêches" bag. Purportedly, she held it in front of herself to disguise her pregnancy. Thus, when the public began calling it the "Kelly" bag, a name subsequently adopted by Hermès, it became hugely popular.

The perfume business became a subsidiary in 1961, concurrently with the introduction of the "Calèche" scent, named after a hooded four-wheeled horse carriage, known since the 18th century, and is also the company's logo since the 1950s. In 2004, Jean-Claude Ellena became the in-house perfumer or "nose" and has created several successful scents, including the Hermessence line of fragrances.

Decline and revamp

Despite apparent success in the 1970s, exemplified by multiple shops having been established worldwide, Hermès declined relative to its competitors. Industry observers attributed this decline to Hermès' insistence on exclusively using natural materials for its products, a differentiation from competitors that were using new, synthetic materials. A two-week lapse in orders exemplified this shift: the Hermès workrooms were silent. A market shift from artificial ingredients back to natural materials renewed demand for Hermès' fragrances and improved the company’s prospects, contributing to the re-establishment of Hermès as a major player in the fragrance industry.

Jean-Louis Dumas, the son of Robert Dumas-Hermès, traveled extensively, studying in the buyer-training program at Bloomingdale's, the New York department store, and joined the family firm in 1964. He became chairman of Hermès in 1978 and concentrated the firm on silk, leather goods, and ready-to-wear, augmenting traditional techniques with new product lines. This transition was instrumental in turning around Hermès’ decline.

Dumas brought in designers Eric Bergère and Bernard Sanz to revamp the apparel collection and, in collaboration, added unusual entries. They included the python motorcycle jackets and ostrich-skin jeans, which were dubbed as "a snazzier version of what Hermès has been all along." (Annual sales in 1978, when Jean-Louis became head of the firm, were reported at US$50 million. By 1990, annual sales were reported at US$460 million, mainly due to Dumas's strategy.) In 1979, he launched an advertising campaign featuring a young, denim-clad woman wearing an Hermès scarf. The purpose was to introduce the Hermès brand to a new set of consumers. As one fashion-sector observer noted: "Much of what bears the still-discreet Hermès label changed from the object of an old person's nostalgia to the subject of young peoples' dreams." However, Dumas's change-of-image created outrage both within and outside of the firm.

Also in the 1970s, the watch subsidiary, La Montre Hermès, was established in Bienne, Switzerland. Then, throughout the 1980s, Dumas strengthened the company's hold on its suppliers, resulting in Hermès's gaining great stakes in prominent French glassware, silverware acquiring venerable tableware manufacturers such as Puiforcat, St. Louis, and Périgord.

Growth
 
From the 1980s, tableware became a strong segment of the firm. And, overall, the collection of Hermès goods expanded in 1990 to include over 30,000 pieces. New materials used in the collection included porcelain and crystal.

Hermès relocated its workshops and design studios to Pantin, just outside Paris. By June 1993, Hermès had gone public on the Paris Bourse (stock exchange). At the time, the equity sale generated great excitement. The 425,000 shares floated at FFr 300 (US$55 at the time) were oversubscribed by 34 times. Dumas told Forbes magazine that the equity sale would help lessen family tensions by allowing some members to liquidate their holdings without "squabbling over share valuations among themselves."

To this time, the Hermès family was still retaining a strong hold of about 80% in stocks, placing Jean-Louis Dumas and the entire family on the Forbes list of billionaires. Mimi Tompkins of U.S. News & World Report called the company "one of Paris' best guarded jewels."

In the following years, Dumas decreased Hermès franchises from 250 to 200 and increased company-owned stores from 60 to 100 to better control sales of its products. The plan was to cost about FFr 200 million in the short term but to increase profits in the long term. Having around FFr 500 million to invest, Hermès pressed ahead, targeting China for company-operated boutiques, finally opening a store in Beijing in 1996.

In 1997, Jean-Louis hired iconoclastic Belgian designer Martin Margiela to supervise women's ready-to-wear.

By the late 1990s, Hermès continued extensively to diminish the number of franchised stores, buying them up and opening more company-operated boutiques. The fashion industry was caught off guard in September 1999, when Jean-Louis decided to pay FFr 150 million for a 35% stake in the Jean-Paul Gaultier fashion house. In the latter part of the 1900s, the company encouraged its clientele to faites nous rêver (make us dream), producing throughout the period artistically atypical orders.

The 2000s to today

In 2003, Martin Margiela left Hermès, and hired Jean Paul Gaultier as the head designer, debuted his first ready-to-wear collection for fall/winter 2004–05.

After 28 years as head of the firm, Jean-Louis Dumas retired in January 2006. Known for his charm and one of Europe's greatest authorities on luxury, he died in 2010 after a long illness. Patrick Thomas, who had joined the company in 1989, and who had worked with Jean-Louis as the co-CEO from 2005, replaced him. Thomas became the first non-Hermès family member to head the company.

In February 2015, Hermès has announced an increase of its turnover of 9.7%, which represents more than €4 billion in sales.

This increase is internationally visible. In Asia, excluding Japan, where the turnover grew 7%, in America, with 10% rise, in Europe where it grew 7% growth and generated a good performance in the group's stores.

In March 2018, Hermès opened a multi-story shop at the Dubai Mall, their largest to date.

In 2019, the brand was ranked 33rd in the Forbes List "World's Most Valuable Brands". 

The 2021 review of WIPO's annual World Intellectual Property Indicators ranked Hermès 7th in the world for the 68 industrial design registrations that were published under the Hague System during 2020. This position is significantly up on their previous 15th place ranking for their 27 industrial design registrations published in 2019.

Following a landmark jury verdict, in February 2023, a New York court ordered artist Mason Rothschild to pay $133,000 in damages to Hermès, for infringing its copyright in his 2021 digital depictions of the Birkin bag in NFTs.

Designers
The designers throughout the company's history have included Lola Prusac, Jacques Delahaye, Catherine de Karolyi, Monsieur Levaillant, Nicole de Vesian, Eric Bergère, Claude Brouet, Tan Giudicelli, Marc Audibet, Mariot Chane, Bernard Sanz, Martin Margiela, Jean-Paul Gaultier, Christophe Lemaire, Véronique Nichanian (the men's-wear designer since 1988), and Nadège Vanhee-Cybulski (since 2014 succeeding Lemaire).

Goods and products

Known for luxury goods, by 2008, Hermès had 14 product divisions that encompassed leather, scarves, ties, men's and women's wear, perfume, watches, stationery, footwear, gloves, enamelware, decorative arts, tableware, and jewellery.

Hermès sales compose about 30% leather goods, 15% clothes, 12% scarves, and 43% other wares. The company licenses no products and keeps tight control over the design and manufacture of its vast inventory.

The firm is very attached to its traditional business model and rejects mass production, assembly lines, and mechanization. Hermès's goods are almost entirely made in France by hand in middle-sized workshops known as Les Ateliers Hermès that emphasise high-quality manufacturing. Indeed, Hermès claims most items are fabricated from beginning to end by only one person, which is supposed to guarantee the quality and uniqueness of its products.

In 2012, Hermès retail outlets changed their policy regarding returns and exchanges of products. Consumers may only exchange items within ten days of purchase and only for another color variant of the original purchase. No other post-purchase exchanges are permitted, and refunds are never offered, regardless of the consumer's having a receipt.

Scarves

The scarf or carré (square) was introduced in 1937. The first example was a 70 cm x 70 cm print of white-wigged females playing a popular period game, a custom-made accessory named "Jeu des Omnibus et Dames Blanches." Hermès oversaw the production of its scarves throughout the entire process, purchasing raw Chinese silk, spinning it into yarn, and weaving it into fabric twice as strong and heavy as most scarves available at the time.

The company's scarf designers spend years creating new print patterns that are individually screen-printed. Designers can choose from over 70,000 different colors. When production first began, a dedicated factory was established in Lyon, France, the same year that Hermès celebrated its 100th anniversary.

Contemporary Hermès carrés measure 90 cm × 90 cm, weigh 65 grams and are woven from the silk of 250 mulberry moth cocoons. All hems are hand-stitched. Motifs are wide-ranging, Two silk-scarf collections per year are released, along with some reprints of older designs and limited editions. And two collections per year are introduced in a Cashmere/silk blend. Since 1937, Hermès has produced over 2,000 unique designs; the horse motif is particularly famous and popular. The ubiquitous "Brides de Gala" version, introduced in 1957, has been produced more than 70,000 times. An Hermès scarf is sold somewhere in the world every 25 seconds; by the late 1970s, more than 1.1 million scarves had been sold worldwide.

Neckties

In 1946, the brand introduced a range of men's silk neckties in an array of motifs and widths. Neckties account for 10% of the company's annual sales.

Partnership with the Tuareg
For years, Hermès has partnered with Tuareg tribesmen for silver jewelry. The Saharan nomads' traditional motifs are often mirrored in various Hermès products, including scarves.

Leather Goods
Hermès is known for its handmade luggage and handbags. One of them might require 18 to 24 hours to produce. The construction of each Kelly bag, for example, requires 18 hours to fully realize. Hermès's leathers come from all over the world. Customers may currently wait from six months to one year for delivery of one of the house's signature bags. Incidentally, should Hermès's leather goods require repair, owners can bring an item to any Hermès store, where it will be shipped to Les Ateliers Hermès in Pantin for repair or reconditioning.

Another famous Hermès handbag, the "Birkin bag", was named after British actress Jane Birkin. In a chance encounter with Jean-Louis Dumas, she complained that her bag was not practical for everyday use. Consequently, he invited her to France where they co-designed the bag in 1984. Birkin has since stopped carrying her namesake bag due to her tendonitis, as the bag became too large and heavy for her to carry. Asked by her that her name be removed and with much back-and-forth comments about various issues such as having her name removed. According to Vogue: "Jane Birkin 'is satisfied by the measures taken by Hermès', according to the brand, following an investigation by the fashion house [that refuted] claims made by PETA that its famous Birkin bags were being 'constructed from the skins of factory-farmed and cruelly slaughtered crocodiles.' "

While the Kelly and Birkin are two of the house's most famous bags, Hermès has a wide range of other popular handbags. One, the bolide is a dome shaped carry all that comes in varying sizes with a leather shoulder strap. It is widely recognized as the first handbag that was constructed with a zipper. The bolide comes in both stiff leathers such as epsom and relaxed leathers such as clemence. Another popular bag from the Hermès house is the evelyne, a comparatively affordable saddle style bag meant to be worn cross body with a traditionally fabric strap. The evelyne is available in 4 different sizes: the TPM (16 cm), PM (29cm), GM (33 cm)and TGM (40cm) and is generally made in relaxed leathers like clemence. The evelyne boasts a perforated "H" motif that is meant to be hidden and worn towards the body, to allow easy access to the top of the bag.

Controversy

In 2021, the Farm Transparency Project released video footage from three Australian crocodile farms owned by Hermès, which showed the small cages and concrete floors the animals live on and how they are slaughtered, including by stabbing and electrocution.

Perfumery
Since 1951, the company has created a number of scents for both men and women, as well as unisex lines. The Hermès line of perfumes includes classic perfumes such as Calèche introduced in 1961 and more recent creations including Terre d'Hermès. The main creator/nose of Hermès perfumes is Jean-Claude Ellena

Feminine fragrances

Masculine fragrances

The Garden Collection

Colognes

Unisex
Eau de Hermes, 1951
Voyage de Hermes, 2016 (eau de toilette and parfum)

Hermessence scents exclusive to Hermès boutiques

Crystal lighting and glass
Belonging to the group is the crystal glass manufacturer Saint-Louis, the oldest crystal company in the world. Since its founding in 1586, Saint-Louis has drawn design inspiration from the decorative periods of the 19th and 20th centuries, from the Restoration to Modern styles, through Napoléon III, Art Nouveau and Art Déco. Saint-Louis became one of the Hermès Group Métiers in 1989.

The Hermès Foundation
The Hermès Foundation was launched in 2008. It is chaired by Pierre-Alexis Dumas, the artistic director of Hermès, and directed by Catherine Tsekenis.

The Foundation embodies the group's goal to sponsor and support creation and craftsmanship activities.

In 2010, it launched the biannual Emile Hermès Prize that rewards an innovative project in the field of design. In 2014, the three winners who shared the first prize, chaired by Italian architect Michele De Lucchi, were Johan Brunel and Samuel Misslen for their "Ventilated Capsule," Antoine Lesur and Marc Venot for "Hut," and Paul Tubiana for "Leon." In 2012, the Foundation participated in the "New Settings" show for the promotion of the arts. In 2013, the Foundation supported the exhibition of works by young artists shown at the Palais de Tokyo. In January 2014, it has pledged a three-year support of the Cité internationale of Aubusson tapestry.

The Foundation operates several contemporary art spaces, including La Verrière in Brussels, Belgium, Le Forum in Tokyo, Japan, and Atelier Hermès in Seoul, South Korea.

Shareholder structure
By 31 December 2016, the Hermès family, as partners of Émile Hermès SARL and their family members, collectively owned 65.1% of the share capital of Hermès International S.A. through a number of asset holding companies and direct ownerships, which entitled the family to 74.8% of the voting rights on allocation of net income and 77.2% on all other matters. Luxury-goods conglomerate LVMH held 20.21% of shares (amassed in the latter half of 2010) and 13.08% of votes at the same date, with 0.39% of shares held as treasury stock and the remaining 16.61% as free float. Speculation that LVMH would launch a takeover bid for Hermès has been repeatedly denied by its chairman Bernard Arnault. Some industry insiders have been in doubt, such as René Weber, an analyst at Zürich's Vontobel Investment Banking, who has claimed: "Arnault is not afraid of a fight and a lot of his battles have been successful for him and his shareholders. Whether he can eventually succeed with [a takeover of] Hermès is still an open question." Bertrand Puech, who chairs the main Hermès family holding company, has criticised LVMH's acquisition of Hermès shares and called on the company to reduce its stake by half.

See also
Mesarchitecture
Revenge buying

References

Bibliography

External links

Official website
Official Foundation Enterprise Hermès website

Clothing brands of France
High fashion brands
Clothing companies of France
Cosmetics companies of France
Retail companies of France
Bags (fashion)
Cosmetics brands
Fashion accessory brands
Glassmaking companies of France
Jewellery retailers of France
Leather manufacturers
Luggage brands
Luxury brands
Perfume houses
Watch brands
Ceramics manufacturers of France
Watch manufacturing companies of France
Manufacturing companies based in Paris
Shops in Paris
Clothing companies established in 1837
Design companies established in 1837
Manufacturing companies established in 1837
Retail companies established in 1837
French companies established in 1837
CAC 40
Companies in the Euro Stoxx 50
Companies listed on Euronext Paris
8th arrondissement of Paris
Comité Colbert members
Hermès-Dumas family